Chokkad is a town situated south-east of Nilambur in the Malappuram district of Kerala, India. The town is located off the state highway between Nilambur and Kalikavu.

See also
Kelunairpady

References

Villages in Malappuram district
Nilambur area